Ukka (officially stylized as ukka), formerly Sakura Ebis (桜エビ〜ず) is a Japanese girl idol group, formed by Stardust Promotion in August 2015.

The group was originally formed as a "little sister" group of Shiritsu Ebisu Chugaku.

Members

Former members

Timeline

History 

2015

On January they started recruiting members for a "little sister" group of Shiritsu Ebisu Chugaku

On May, Sakura Ebis was launched with 4 members: Mizuha, Misato, Riju and Ayame

On July, Sora was incorporated into the group as the 5th member

On August 1, they showed for the first time at TIF2015 .

2016

On January 17, they held their first one-man live. Moa joins as the 6 member

On July 30, they released their 1st CD-R

On July 31, they performed at Girls Factory Day 2 (Ebichu's Day)

2017

On September 2, they released their 1st CD Single "Watashi Romance" in Yokohama Bay Hall 

2018

On March 21, they released their 1st Album "Sakuraebis" 

2019

On August 21, they released their 2nd Album "Octave"

On November 16, they announced that they would change their name to "ukka"

2020

On December 28, Misato Sakurai graduated from the group

2021

On March 18, it was announced that Mizuha had left the group

On July 28,  they released their 1st EP "T.O.N.E"

On September 25, Rina and Ruri joins as a result of the audition

2022

On May 5, They sign their major debut contract with Teichiku Records label

Discography

Albums

EP's

Singles

Digital singles

Collaboration singles

References

External links 
 Official website

Japanese idol groups
Japanese girl groups
Japanese pop music groups
Child musical groups
Japanese-language singers
Musical groups established in 2015
2015 establishments in Japan
Stardust Promotion artists